"Power of Positive Drinkin'" is a song written by Don Pfrimmer and Rick Klang, and recorded by American country music artist Mickey Gilley.  It was released in March 1978 as the lead single from his album Flyin' High.  The song reached number 8 on the U.S. Billboard Hot Country Singles chart and number 7 on the Canadian RPM Country Tracks chart.

Chart performance

References

1978 singles
1978 songs
Mickey Gilley songs
Songs written by Don Pfrimmer
Song recordings produced by Eddie Kilroy
Playboy Records singles
Songs about alcohol